Elizabeth Township is one of the fourteen townships of Lawrence County, Ohio, United States. As of the 2010 census the population was 2,969.

Geography
Located in the western part of the county, it borders the following townships:
Decatur Township - north
Aid Township - east
Lawrence Township - southeast
Upper Township - south
Hamilton Township - southwest
Green Township, Scioto County - west
Vernon Township, Scioto County - northwest

No municipalities are located in Elizabeth Township, although the unincorporated communities of Etna and Pedro lie in the eastern part of the township.

Name and history
Statewide, the only other Elizabeth Township is located in Miami County.

Government
The township is governed by a three-member board of trustees, who are elected in November of odd-numbered years to a four-year term beginning on the following January 1. Two are elected in the year after the presidential election and one is elected in the year before it. There is also an elected township fiscal officer, who serves a four-year term beginning on April 1 of the year after the election, which is held in November of the year before the presidential election. Vacancies in the fiscal officership or on the board of trustees are filled by the remaining trustees.

References

External links
County website

Townships in Lawrence County, Ohio
Townships in Ohio